Yummy is a 2019 Belgian comedy horror film directed by Lars Damoiseaux while co-written by Damoiseaux and Eveline Hagenbeek. Starring Maaike Neuville, Bart Hollanders, Benjamin Ramon and Clara Cleymans, Yummy is the first Belgian zombie film. It tells a story of a zombie outbreak that occurs after a Belgian couple and her mum that goes to a hospital in the Eastern Europe to have plastic surgery.

Damoiseaux and Hagenbeek has started to work on the script of the movie in November 2010, and the principal photography was begun in November 2018. It was premiered on December 13, 2019, in Bobbejaanland. The film was released on December 18, 2019, in Belgium.

Cast 
 Maaike Neuville - Alison
 Bart Hollanders - Michael
 Benjamin Ramon - Daniel
 Clara Cleymans - Janja
 Annick Christiaens - Sylvia
 Eric Godon - Dr. K.
 Joshua Rubin - Yonah
 Taeke Nicolaï - Oksana
 Tom Audenaert - William
 Noureddine Farihi - Kuisman

References

External links 

 
 

Belgian comedy horror films
2019 comedy horror films
Zombie comedy films
2010s Dutch-language films
2010s English-language films
Shudder (streaming service) original programming
2019 multilingual films
Dutch multilingual films
Belgian zombie films